Hovea longifolia commonly known as rusty pods, is a flowering plant in the family Fabaceae, endemic to eastern Australia. It has purple pea flowers, linear leaves with rusty felt like hairs on the lower surface.

Description
The upper surface green, shiny, smooth, hairless except for a dense row of midrib hairs, and the lower surface densely covered in yellow-brown curled, felt like hairs. The purple standard petal is twice the length of the calyx, with darker purple veins and a yellow centre, the wings  and keel shorter.

Taxonomy and naming
Hovea longifolia was first formally described in 1812 by Robert Brown and the description was published in Hortus Kewensis. The specific epithet (longifolia)  means "long leaved".

Distribution and habitat
Rusty pods grows in shady, moist situations near stream banks and slopes, mostly from Narooma to Judge Dowling Range in New South Wales.

References

longifolia
Flora of New South Wales
Flora of Queensland
Flora of Victoria (Australia)
Fabales of Australia
Taxa named by Robert Brown (botanist, born 1773)